Younes Masoudi (born 13 April 1981) is an Iranian retired footballer who played as a defender. During his 13-year career, he appeared for Payam Khorasan and Shahrdari Yasuj.

Playing career

Masoudi joined the youth teams of Payam Khorasan in 1996. He started his professional career with the club in 2001. On 23 January 2009, Masoudi made his professional debut, starting in Persian Gulf Cup action against PAS Hamedan. He played the full 90 minutes in a 4–1 defeat for Payam.

After playing ten seasons with Payam, including a stint as the club captain, Masoudi moved to Shahrdari Yasuj in the summer of 2011.

Coaching career
Payam Khorasan established the Payam Football Academy in 2010; while still playing for the club, Masoudi was appointed as the first director of the academy. He continued as a coach after retiring as a player, earning his B license from the Asian Football Confederation.

In 2020, he launched a campaign on Instagram to revive her favorite club, Payam Khorasan.

Honours
Payam Khorasan
 Azadegan League : Champion 2007–08
Shahrdari Yasuj
Hazfi Cup : Semi Final 2011–12

References

External links

  

1981 births
Living people
Iranian footballers
People from Bojnord
Association football defenders
Payam Mashhad players
Zagros Yasuj F.C. players
Persian Gulf Pro League players
Azadegan League players